Oak Valley is an unincorporated community in Yuba County, California.

Oak Valley
"This little mining town is situated on the head waters of Oak Valley Creek, two miles from North Yuba River, and six miles northeast from Camptonville. It received its name on account of oak timber growing in the vicinity. Gold was discovered here about the same time as at the other diggings, and quite a town sprang up. In 1855, there were one hundred men here, a store, saloon, restaurant, hotel, etc. For ten years the town thrived and then went down as did most of the other places. There are about twenty men at work now, and a store and saloon combined kept by a Frenchman."
- Thompson & West, History of Yuba County, 1879

The town at its founding is the setting of Catherine Bell's 2014 novel, Rush of Shadows.

References

Unincorporated communities in California
Unincorporated communities in Yuba County, California